Shawn Burke (born 1982) is the general manager of the Ottawa Redblacks of the Canadian Football League (CFL). He previously spent 15 years in administrative and personnel related positions with the  Hamilton Tiger-Cats. Burke is a graduate of the Sports Administration program at Durham College.

Administrative career

Hamilton Tiger-Cats
Burke was first hired by the Hamilton Tiger-Cats as the team's director of community relations in 2007 and would watch game film with Ron Lancaster. He added the title of director of communications in 2009, serving in both roles for two years. He then moved to the technical side of the franchise as he was named director of football operations in 2011. Burke was promoted to assistant general manager on March 11, 2016, while retaining many of his previous responsibilities. After three years in the assistant GM role, he was named senior director of personnel and co-manager of football operations, along with Drew Allemang, on January 3, 2019, effectively making the pair the team's co-general managers. Under two seasons of Burke in the top personnel position, the Tiger-Cats had a  record and appeared in two Grey Cup games.

Ottawa Redblacks
On December 19, 2021, Burke was named the general manager of the Ottawa Redblacks.

Personal life
Both of Burke's parents died of lung cancer by the time he was 20 years old. Burke has one brother, Dave Burke Jr.

References

External links
Ottawa Redblacks bio

1966 births
Living people
Hamilton Tiger-Cats general managers
Ottawa Redblacks general managers
Sportspeople from Guelph